Czesław Stanula C.Ss.R. (27 March 1940 – 14 May 2020) was a Polish-Brazilian Roman Catholic bishop.

Stanula was born in Poland and was ordained to the priesthood in 1964. He served as bishop of the Roman Catholic Diocese of Floresta, Brazil from 1989 to 1997 and as bishop of the Roman Catholic Diocese of Itabuna, Brazil, from 1997 to 2017.

Notes

1943 births
2020 deaths
21st-century Roman Catholic bishops in Brazil
Polish Roman Catholic priests
Polish emigrants to Brazil
20th-century Roman Catholic bishops in Brazil
Roman Catholic bishops of Floresta
Roman Catholic bishops of Itabuna